The Monmouth County Vocational School District (MCVSD) is a vocational and technical public school district in Monmouth County, New Jersey, United States, providing vocational education to students across the county. Monmouth County Vocational School District has 15 learning environments. The shared time programs located in Aberdeen Township, Freehold Township, Hazlet Township, Keyport, Long Branch, Middletown Township and Wall Township provide students with field experience in various trades and professions.

As of the 2020–21 school year, the district, comprised of nine schools, had an enrollment of 1,596 students and 231.6 classroom teachers (on an FTE basis), for a student–teacher ratio of 6.9:1.

Many of the academies provide students with academic and professional field experience. In addition, MCVSD manages three specialty schools for students at risk as well as the MCVSD Law Enforcement Program for students interested in a career in Law Enforcement.

Schools 

Schools in the district (with 2020–21 enrollment date from the National Center for Education Statistics) are:

 Academy of Allied Health & Science (AAHS) in Neptune Township (306 students; in grades 9-12)
 Biotechnology High School (BTHS) in Freehold Borough (315; 9-12)
 Communications High School (CHS) in Wall Township (306; 9-12)
 High Technology High School (HTHS) in the Lincroft section of Middletown Township (295; 9-12)
 Marine Academy of Science and Technology (MAST) in Sandy Hook in Middletown Township (283; 9-12)
Other full-time programs
 Academy of Law and Public Safety in Long Branch (75; 9-12)
 CLASS Academy, an alternative high school program in Tinton Falls (18; 9-12)
Other / shared-time programs
 Monmouth County Career Center in Freehold (13; 9-12)
 Monmouth County Vocational Technical High School in Hazlet (15; 11-12)

Awards and recognition
Academy of Allied Health & Science
For the 2001-02 school year, the Academy of Allied Health & Science received the National Blue Ribbon Award of Excellence from the United States Department of Education, the highest honor that an American school can achieve.
For the 1999-2000 school year, the school was named a "Star School" by the New Jersey Department of Education, the highest honor that a New Jersey school can achieve.
Governor's School of Excellence 2003-2004.
For the 2006-07 school year, the Academy of Allied Health & Science received a second National Blue Ribbon Award of Excellence from the United States Department of Education, (the first school in the entire Northeast region to receive the ribbon a second time) the highest honor that an American school can achieve.
The school was recognized by Governor Jim McGreevey in 2003 as one of 25 schools selected statewide for the First Annual Governor's School of Excellence award.
High Technology High School
For the 2003-04 school year, High Technology High School received the National Blue Ribbon Award of Excellence from the United States Department of Education, the highest honor that an American school can achieve.
High Technology High School was twice named a "Star School" by the New Jersey Department of Education, the highest form of recognition for a New Jersey school, in both 1994-95.
High Technology High School was twice named within the top five high schools in the nation by U.S. News magazine, in both 2007 and 2008. In 2007, it received the 5th place rank, and in 2008, it received the 4th best high school ranking.
In 2007, 2008, and 2010, High Technology High School was recognized by Newsweek magazine as a Public Elite school, due to its exceptional quality and its high average scores on standardized testing like the SAT and ACT.
Biotechnology High School
In 2010, Biotech was recognized by Newsweek magazine as a Public Elite school, due to its exceptional quality and its high average scores on standardized testing like the SAT and ACT.
In 2013 and 2014 Biotechnology High School was ranked the number one high school in New Jersey by U.S. News magazine.
The school was one of 11 in the state to be recognized in 2014 by the United States Department of Education's National Blue Ribbon Schools Program.
Marine Academy of Science and Technology
Marine Academy was named a "Star School" by the New Jersey Department of Education, the highest honor that a New Jersey school can achieve, in the 1993-94 school year.
For the 1997-98 school year, the Marine Academy was designated a Blue Ribbon School by the United States Department of Education.
Communications High School
For the 2012-13 school year, Communications High School received the Blue Ribbon Award from the United States Department of Education, the highest honor that an American school can achieve.
The school was honored by the National Blue Ribbon Schools Program in 2019, one of nine schools in the state recognized as Exemplary High Performing Schools.

Administration
Core members of the district's administration are:
Charles R. Ford Jr., Superintendent
Kelly A. Brazelton, Business Administrator / Board Secretary

Board of education
The district's board of education is comprised of five members. The county executive superintendent of schools serves on an ex officio basis. The other four members are appointed by the Monmouth County Board of County Commissioners to four-year terms of office. The board appoints a superintendent to oversee the day-to-day operation of the district.

References

External links
Official website

Data for the Monmouth County Vocational School District, National Center for Education Statistics

New Jersey District Factor Group none
School districts in Monmouth County, New Jersey
Vocational school districts in New Jersey